Scrobipalpuloides inapparens is a moth in the family Gelechiidae. It was described by Povolný in 1987. It is found in Argentina.

References

Scrobipalpuloides
Moths described in 1987